Independent Companies, New Mexico Volunteer Cavalry were volunteer cavalry companies in the Union Army during the American Civil War.

Among these Volunteer Companies, named for there captains, were:
Mink's Independent Cavalry Company (1861)
Graydon's Independent Cavalry Company (1862)
Graydon's Independent Cavalry Company - Reorganized (1862) 	
Haspell's Independent Cavalry Company (1861)
Vidal's Independent Cavalry Company (1861)

See also
 List of New Mexico Territory Civil War units

References

Units and formations of the Union Army from New Mexico Territory
1861 establishments in New Mexico Territory
1862 establishments in New Mexico Territory